The R721 is a Regional Route in Free State, South Africa that connects Kroonstad with Vredefort. It was formerly part of the N1 National Route, before the Kroonvaal Toll Route was made.

Route
The R721's northern terminus is a junction with the R59 in Vredefort. From there, it heads south for 5 km to meet the north-western terminus of the R720. It continues southwards for 70 km to Kroonstad, where it ends at an interchange with the R34 and the N1 Highway north of the city centre.

This route from Vredefort to Kroonstad was formerly part of the N1, before the construction of the Kroonvaal Toll Route.

References 

Regional Routes in the Free State (province)